Kasina Diane Douglass-Boone (born 1974) is a former member of the Nevada Assembly.

Early life and education
Douglass-Boone was born in 1974 in Las Vegas, Nevada. Douglass-Boone graduated from Western High School. Douglass-Boone earned a A.A. from the Community College of Southern Nevada and a B.S. from Ashford University in Clinton, Iowa.

Career
Douglass-Boone has worked for the Clark County School District for more than 20 years. She has worked in a number of different capacities for the district, including as a social worker. On June 9, 2020, Douglass-Boone ran unsuccessfully in the primary for the Clark County Board of Trustees seat representing District B. On July 7, 2020, Douglass-Boone was appointed by the Clark County Commission to fill the vacancy in the Nevada Assembly left by Tyrone Thompson's death. She was the only one who applied to fill the vacancy. She represented the 17th district of the state assembly until November 4, 2020.

In 2022, Douglass-Boone supported a ballot initiative proposed by a culinary union seeking to cap rent payments in North Las Vegas, citing her own experiences with high rent.

Personal life
Kasina is married to Anthony Boone III.

References

Living people
1974 births
African-American women in politics
African-American state legislators in Nevada
College of Southern Nevada alumni
Democratic Party members of the Nevada Assembly
Politicians from Las Vegas
Women state legislators in Nevada
21st-century American politicians
21st-century American women politicians
21st-century African-American women
21st-century African-American politicians
20th-century African-American people
20th-century African-American women